Edavakkudi is a village in the Papanasam taluk of Thanjavur district, Tamil Nadu, India.

Demographics 

As per the 2001 census, Edavakkudi had a total population of 946 with 488 males and 458 females. The sex ratio was 939. The literacy rate was 70.17.

References 

 

Villages in Thanjavur district